El Hadj Amadou Dia Bâ  (born September 22, 1958) is a retired Senegalese athlete who competed in 400 metres hurdles. He won the 1988 Olympic silver medal in this event with a personal best time of 47.23 seconds. It was the first and so far the only Olympic medal for Senegal. He competed in three consecutive Summer Olympics for his native country, starting in 1984.

Achievements

References

External links

Senegalese male hurdlers
Senegalese male high jumpers
1958 births
Living people
Olympic athletes of Senegal
Athletes (track and field) at the 1984 Summer Olympics
Athletes (track and field) at the 1988 Summer Olympics
Athletes (track and field) at the 1992 Summer Olympics
Olympic silver medalists for Senegal
Olympic silver medalists in athletics (track and field)
African Games gold medalists for Senegal
African Games medalists in athletics (track and field)
Universiade medalists in athletics (track and field)
Athletes (track and field) at the 1978 All-Africa Games
Athletes (track and field) at the 1987 All-Africa Games
Universiade medalists for Senegal
Medalists at the 1988 Summer Olympics